There are nine national parks and reserves in Malawi.

National parks
Kasungu National Park — situated approximately 165 km north of the capital city, Lilongwe, this is, at over 2,000 km², the second largest of Malawi's parks
Lake Malawi National Park — designated a National Park in 1980 to protect the unique diversity of tropical fish living in Lake Malawi, some not found anywhere else on earth
Lengwe National Park — most famed for the nyala antelope, not found in the other northern parks of Malawi
Liwonde National Park — situated 120 km north of Blantyre, on the banks of the Upper Shire River
Nyika National Park — the first (certified in 1965), the largest (over 3,000 km²) and the highest (average height 1,800 m)

Game and wildlife reserves
Majete Wildlife Reserve — in the southwest of Malawi, with an area of 691 km²
Mwabvi Wildlife Reserve — the smallest of the parks, at 350 km², Mwabvi was adopted by Project African Wilderness in 2007 (PAW is a charitable organisation based in Malawi and the UK)
Nkhotakota Wildlife Reserve — the oldest and largest established reserve in Malawi
Vwaza Marsh Game Reserve — southwest of the Nyika Plateau, to the north of the South Rukuru River, Vwaza Marsh covers an area of 1,000 km²

Other protected areas 
Lake Chilwa - Ramsar wetland of international importance

Forest reserves 
Malawi has a system of forest reserves, the first of which were established over a century ago. Grazing and cultivation have encroached on many forest reserves, and many reserve forests have been replaced with exotic plantation trees including pine and eucalyptus.

Northern Region 
Bunganya Forest Reserve 34.7 km² est. 1973
Chikhang’ombe Forest Reserve 5921 ha. est. 2002
Chisasira Forest Reserve 3447 ha. est. 1973
Jembya Forest Reserve 13,764 ha. est. 1981
Kalwe Forest Reserve 159 ha. est. 1956
Kamphoyo Forest Reserve 635 ha.
Kaning’ina Forest Reserve 14,007 ha. est. 1935
Kawiya Forest Reserve 643.9 ha.
Kuwirwe Forest Reserve 661.5 ha. est. 1935
Litchenya Forest Reserve 316 ha. est. 1948
Lunyangwa Forest Reserve 374 ha. est. 1935
Mafinga Hills Forest Reserve 4734 ha. est. 1976
Mahowe Forest Reserve 59.168 km² est. 2002
Matipa Forest Reserve 1055 ha. est. 1948
Mkuwazi Forest Reserve 1608 ha. est. 1927
Mtangatanga Forest Reserve 8099 ha. est. 1935
Mughese Forest Reserve 771 ha. est. 1948
Musisi Forest Reserve 7034 ha. est. 1948
North Karonga Escarpment Forest Reserve 7907 ha. est. 2002
Perekezi Forest Reserve 14,482 ha. est. 1935
Ruvuo Forest Reserve 4792.9 ha. est. 1935
South Karonga Escarpment Forest Reserve 13,050 ha. est. 2002
South Viphya Forest Reserve (Chikangawa Forest Reserve) 157,728 ha. est. 1958
Uzumara Forest Reserve 754 ha. est. 1948
Vinthukutu Forest Reserve 1957 ha. est. 1948
Wilindi Forest Reserve 937 ha. est. 1948

Central Region 
Bunda Forest Reserve 426 ha, est. 1948
Chimaliro Forest Reserve 15,205 ha, est. 1926
Chilobwe Forest Reserve 1314 ha, est. 1960
Chongoni Forest Reserve 12,353 ha, est. 1924
Dedza Mountain Forest Reserve 2917 ha, est. 1926
Dedza-Salima Escarpment Forest Reserve 30,965 ha, est. 1974
Dowa Hills Forest Reserve 3142 ha, est. 1974
Dwambazi Forest Reserve, 7886.27 km²
Dzalanyama Forest Reserve 98,827 ha, est. 1922
Dzenza Forest Reserve 779 ha, est. 1948
Dzonzi Forest Reserve 4494 ha, est. 1924
Kongwe Forest Reserve 1948 ha, est. 1926
Mchinji Forest Reserve 20,885 ha, est. 1924
Msitowalengwe Forest Reserve 98 ha, est. 1974
Mua-Livulezi Forest Reserve 12,673 ha, est. 1924
Mua-Tsanya Forest Reserve 933 ha, est. 1924
Mvai Forest Reserve 4140 ha, est. 1924
Ngala Forest Reserve 2272 ha, est. 1958
North Senga Forest Reserve 1207 ha, est. 1958
Ntchisi Mountain Forest Reserve 8758 ha, est. 1924
South Senga Forest Reserve 532 ha, est. 1958
Thuma Forest Reserve 15,767 ha, est. 1956

Southern Region 
Amalika Forest Reserve 370 ha, est. 1959
Chigumula Forest Reserve 525 ha, est. 1925
Chiradzulu Forest Reserve 774 ha, est. 1924
Kalulu Hills Forest Reserve 2892 ha, est. 1958
Liwonde Forest Reserve 27,407 ha, est. 1924
Malabvi Forest Reserve 300 ha, est. 1927
Mangochi Forest Reserve 40,853 ha, est. 1924
Mangochi Palm Forest Reserve 501 ha, est. 1980
Masambanjati Forest Reserve 93 ha, est. 1974
Masenjere Forest Reserve 276 ha, est. 1930
Mulanje Mountain Forest Reserve (Milange-Michesi) 56,314 ha, est. 1927
Michiru Forest Reserve 3004 ha, est. 1970
Milare Forest Reserve 59 ha, est. 1949
Mudi Forest Reserve 39 ha, est. 1922
Namizimu Forest Reserve 88,966 ha, est. 1924
Ndirande Forest Reserve 1433 ha, est. 1922
Soche Forest Reserve 388 ha, est. 1922
Thambani Forest Reserve 4680 ha, est. 1927
Thuchila Forest Reserve 1843 ha, est. 1925
Thyolo Mountain Forest Reserve 1347 ha, est. 1924
Matandwe Forest Reserve 31,053 ha, est. 1931
Tsamba Forest Reserve 32.37 km², est. 1928
Thyolomwani Forest Reserve 965 ha, est. 1930
Zomba-Malosa Forest Reserve 19,018 ha, est. 1913

References

External links
 

Malawi
National parks
 List
Protected areas